The 1938 Montana State Bobcats football team was an American football team that represented Montana State College (later renamed Montana State University) in the Rocky Mountain Conference (RMC) during the 1938 college football season. In its ninth, non-consecutive season under head coach Schubert R. Dyche, the team compiled a 3–5–1 record (1–0–1 against RMC opponents) and won the conference championship.

Three Montana State players were selected as first-team players on the 1938 All-Rocky Mountain Conference football team: fullback Don Cosner and guards Max Kimberly and John Vollmer. End Dana Bradford was named to the second team.

Schedule

References

Montana State
Montana State Bobcats football seasons
Rocky Mountain Athletic Conference football champion seasons
Montana State Bobcats football